Benno Wiss  (born 13 July 1962) is a retired track cyclist and road bicycle racer from Switzerland, who was a professional road rider from 1984 to 1986. He represented his native country at the 1984 Summer Olympics in Los Angeles, California, where he won the silver medal in the men's team time trial, alongside Alfred Achermann, Richard Trinkler and Laurent Vial. He is a two-time winner of the Circuit Franco-Belge.

References

External links
 

1962 births
Living people
Swiss male cyclists
Cyclists at the 1984 Summer Olympics
Olympic cyclists of Switzerland
Olympic silver medalists for Switzerland
Olympic medalists in cycling
People from Muri District
Medalists at the 1984 Summer Olympics
Sportspeople from Aargau